The Massachusetts 3rd General Court District (or "3rd Middlesex") is an electoral district for the Massachusetts House of Representatives. Located in central Massachusetts, it comprises the towns of Hudson, Maynard and Stow (all of which are located in Middlesex County), as well as the town of Bolton (located in Worcester County). Democrat Kate Hogan of Stow has represented the district since 2013. She is running unopposed for re-election in the 2020 Massachusetts general election.

The current district geographic boundary overlaps with those of the Massachusetts Senate's Middlesex and Worcester district and Worcester and Middlesex district.

District History
The 3rd District has existed in its current iteration since the 2004 redistricting.

Former locale
The district previously covered part of Charlestown, circa 1872.

Representatives
 Isaac F. Shepard, circa 1859 
 Russell A. Wood circa 1910
 Arthur Enoch Beane, circa 1920 
 Louis L. Green, circa 1920 
 Arthur K. Reading, circa 1920 
 Paul Andrew Dever, 1928-1935 
 Tip O'Neill, circa 1945
 Charles F. Flaherty, Jr., 1967–1979 
 Paul Cellucci, 1979–1985
 Patricia Walrath, 1985–2009
 Kate Hogan, 2009–present

Electoral history
From 1985 to 2009, the 3rd District was represented by Democrat Patricia Walrath, who decided not to seek re-election in 2008. Since 2009, the District has been represented by Democrat Kate Hogan.

2014

2012

2010

Voter Affiliation

See also
 Other Middlesex County districts of the Massachusetts House of Representatives: 1st, 2nd, 4th, 5th, 6th, 7th, 8th, 9th, 10th, 11th, 12th, 13th, 14th, 15th, 16th, 17th, 18th, 19th, 20th, 21st, 22nd, 23rd, 24th, 25th, 26th, 27th, 28th, 29th, 30th, 31st, 32nd, 33rd, 34th, 35th, 36th, 37th
 List of former districts of the Massachusetts House of Representatives

Images
Portraits of legislators

References

Further reading

External links
 Massachusetts House Legislative Districts

House Middlesex 03
Government of Middlesex County, Massachusetts
Government in Worcester County, Massachusetts